Antoon is a Dutch masculine given name that is an alternate form of Antonius used in Belgium, Netherlands, Suriname, South Africa, Namibia, and Indonesia, a nickname and a surname.  Antoon is also a transliteration of Arabic , also spelt , and typically used as both a given name and surname of Christian Arabs.  Notable people with the name Antoon include:

Given name
Antoon Coolen (1897–1961), Dutch writer
Antoon Jozef Witteryck (1865–1934), Belgian writer
Antoon van Schendel (1910–1990), Dutch professional road bicycle racer

Nickname
Antoon Kolen, nickname for Anthonius Wilhelmus Johannes Kolen (1953 – 2004), Dutch mathematician
Antoon Vergote, nickname for Antoine Vergote (1921 – 2013), Belgian Roman Catholic priest
Antoon Verlegh, nickname for Antonius Wilhelmus Verlegh (1896-1960), Dutch football player

Surname
A. J. Antoon (1944-1992), American theatre director
Feras Antoon (born 1975), Syrian-born Canadian businessman in the online pornography industry
John Antoon (born 1946), American lawyer and judge
Sinan Antoon (born 1967), Iraqi American poet and novelist
Jason Antoon (born 1971), American actor

See also
White-nosed coati, sometimes called Antoon

Anthon (given name)
Anthon (surname)
Antoan
Antoin
Anton (given name)
Antono (name)
Antoon
Antoun
Antron (given name)
Antton (name)
Antwon (name)
Antxon

Notes

Dutch masculine given names
Nicknames